Wielsbeke is a municipality located in the Belgian province of West Flanders. The municipality comprises the towns of Ooigem, Sint-Baafs-Vijve and Wielsbeke proper. On January 1, 2018, Wielsbeke had a total population of 9,584. The total area is 21.76 km² which gives a population density of 440 inhabitants per km².

Notable people
 Jan Callewaert (b. Wielsbeke, 1956), founder of Option N.V. 
 Niko Eeckhout, a professional road racing cyclist. He was the champion of Belgium in 2006.
 Noël Demeulenaere, a person who has a lot of influence in cyclism and former mayor of the village.
 Wim Vromant writes books for children.
 Tessa Wullaert, professional footballer who plays as a forward for Anderlecht and the Belgium national team.

Images

See also
 Beaulieu International Group

References

External links

Official website  - Available only in Dutch

Municipalities of West Flanders